Moran (lit. Viburnum) is a kibbutz in northern Israel. Located in the Lower Galilee near Karmiel, it falls under the jurisdiction of Misgav Regional Council.

History
Kibbutz Moran was founded in 1977 by a kvutza of youths, most of whom had grown up in cities, and who had been training in kibbutz Ginosar. It was named for the viburnum plant that grows wild in the area.

The kibbutz runs a 28-room guesthouse.

References

Kibbutzim
Kibbutz Movement
Populated places established in 1977
Populated places in Northern District (Israel)
1977 establishments in Israel